David Dunger  (died 20 July 2021) was a British paediatric endocrinologist and chair of paediatrics at the University of Cambridge. Dunger was most notable for research into three areas, pathogenesis of type 1 diabetes and its complications, perinatal origins of risk for obesity and type 2 diabetes along with experimental medicine.

Life
Dunger undertook his clinical training at Great Ormond Street Hospital, University of London, specialising in paediatric diabetes and paediatric endocrinology  achieving a Bachelor of Medicine, Bachelor of Surgery on 1 January 1971.

Dunger died on 20 July 2021.

Career
Between 1986 and 2000 Dunger was Consultant Paediatric Endocrinologist at the John Radcliffe Hospital, University of Oxford. In 2000, Dunger was appointed to Addenbrooke's Hospital and at the same time took up the second Chair of Paediatrics at the University of Cambridge.

Awards and honours
In 2002, Dunger won the Research Award of the European Society for Paediatric Endocrinology for conducting outstanding research in the field. In 2012, Dunger was awarded the Andrea Prader Prize, from the same society, in recognising his outstanding achievements in leadership, teaching and clinical practice in the field of pediatric endocrinology. The award was named in honour of Andrea Prader, the Swiss scientist, pediatric endocrinologist, who discovered Prader–Willi syndrome. In 2015, Dunger was awarded the James Spence Medal.

Bibliography
Dunger co-wrote these highly cited articles:

References

Year of birth missing
20th-century births
2021 deaths
British paediatricians
Alumni of the University of London
Recipients of the James Spence Medal
Academics of the University of Cambridge
Academics of the University of Oxford
British paediatric endocrinologists
NIHR Senior Investigators